SS City of Milwaukee is a Great Lakes railroad car ferry that once plied Lake Michigan, often between Muskegon, Michigan and Milwaukee, Wisconsin. She was built in 1931 for the Grand Trunk Milwaukee Car Ferry Company and is the only pre-1940s ship of this type to survive.  She now serves as a museum ship, bed and breakfast, and event venue on the waterfront of Manistee Lake in Manistee, Michigan.  She was designated a National Historic Landmark in 1990.

Description
The City of Milwaukee is a steel-hulled ship with a carrying capacity of 28–30 fully loaded rail cars. She was powered by four Scotch marine boilers, producing  of pressure. She has a relatively shallow draft, determined in part because ships carrying railroad vehicles needed to have a flat deck. The hull is divided into eight compartments. Listed in order from bow to stern is the chain locker, hold No.1, hold No.2, boiler room, engine room, flicker (crew quarters), shaft alley and lastly the steering engine room. The car deck is mostly covered and sheltered on the sides by the hull. There are four pairs of rails, with extra rails outside each pair to which the cars being carried were anchored by chains. The engineering and galley crew quarters, galley, passenger dining room, crew mess, and passenger staterooms are located on the deck directly above the cardeck. The deck above the passenger deck is the Texas deck, which housed the Captain's and Mate's quarters, as well as some lookouts and watchmen. Above the Texas deck is the pilot house, where main navigation of the vessel took place. There is also a small pilot house on the stern that is used for docking the vessel.

The ship was built in 1930 and launched in 1931 at Manitowoc, Wisconsin to replace , which sank with all hands on October 22, 1929, during a gale.  Car ferry service had been introduced to the Great Lakes in 1892, and there were many as 14 vessels operating on the lakes at the system's peak.  These specialized vessels were capable of carrying up to 34 railroad cars across the often stormy and ice-packed lakes at any time of year. City of Milwaukee sailed for the Grand Trunk until 1978 when, as the last of their fleet of three to be sailing, she was chartered to the Ann Arbor Railroad. She sailed for this road until 1982, when she was retired permanently. She is currently preserved in Manistee, Michigan as a National Historic Landmark Museum, owned by the Society for the Preservation of the S.S. City of Milwaukee, a non-profit organization. In addition to being a museum to tour, she is also operated seasonally as a bed and breakfast, and every October she is transformed into Manistee's Ghost Ship, where nearly the entire ship is turned into a haunted attraction in order to raise funds. She is the last unmodified traditional railroad car ferry afloat upon the lakes, still with her triple expansion steam engine, original woodwork and brass fixtures.

See also
List of National Historic Landmarks in Michigan
National Register of Historic Places listings in Manistee County, Michigan

References

External links
 S.S. City of Milwaukee web site
 HNSA Ship Page: S.S. City of Milwaukee

Great Lakes ships
Museum ships in Michigan
National Historic Landmarks in Michigan
Ships on the National Register of Historic Places in Michigan
Grand Trunk Railway
Rail infrastructure on the National Register of Historic Places in Michigan
National Register of Historic Places in Manistee County, Michigan
Museums in Manistee County, Michigan
Train ferries
Ferries of Michigan
Ferries of Wisconsin
1931 ships
Ships built in Manitowoc, Wisconsin
Passenger ships of the Great Lakes